GLO Airlines was an American regional airline brand based in New Orleans, Louisiana.

History
The airline started service in November 2015 and utilized a fleet of three 30-seat Saab 340B aircraft. GLO was founded by Calvin "Trey" Fayard and was operated by Corporate Flight Management.

In April 2017, GLO Airlines declared bankruptcy, after Corporate Flight Management "unilaterally terminated its contract to operate GLO's program and fly passengers". Operations were initially suspended; however, they resumed on 25 April. GLO service was suspended again on July 15, 2017 and has not resumed.

Destinations

See also 
 List of defunct airlines of the United States

References

Airlines established in 2015
Airlines disestablished in 2017
2015 establishments in Louisiana
American companies established in 2015
2017 disestablishments in Louisiana
Defunct regional airlines of the United States